Bid Hal (also Romanized as Bīd Ḩal and Bīd Hel; also known as Bīd Gol and Eslāmābād) is a village in Beyranvand-e Shomali Rural District, Bayravand District, Khorramabad County, Lorestan Province, Iran. At the 2006 census, its population was 294, in 65 families.

References 

Towns and villages in Khorramabad County